Pterolophia m-griseum is a species of beetle in the family Cerambycidae. It was described by Étienne Mulsant in 1846, originally under the genus Albana. It is known from Spain and France. It feeds on Genista scorpius and Genista cinerea.

References

m-griseum
Beetles described in 1846